Rhea W. Boyd is an American pediatrician and child and community health advocate. Boyd is a popular science communicator, making use of social media to amplify a diverse range of voices in an effort to improve the heath of communities of colour.

Early life and education 
Boyd grew up in Los Angeles and Akron, Ohio. As a child, Boyd attended a predominantly-white Catholic school. She wanted to be a physician.

In 2006, Boyd received a bachelor's degree in a customized program of Africana studies and health from the University of Notre Dame. While in college she was a journalist for the student newspaper, where she wrote about race in America. In 2010, Boyd received a medical degree is from Vanderbilt University School of Medicine. She moved to California, completing a residency in pediatrics at the University of California, San Francisco (UCSF)'s UCSF Medical Center in 2013.

While a medical resident at University of California, San Francisco Boyd launched a blog about being a paediatrician. Boyd was part of the Paediatric Leadership for the Underserved residency, which trains paediatricians to provide healthcare for children from marginalised backgrounds. In 2017, Boyd completed a Master of Public Health at the Harvard T.H. Chan School of Public Health. She held a Commonwealth Fund Mongan Minority Health Policy Fellowship.

Career
Boyd works as a clinical physician. Since she has partnered with San Diego 211 as chief medical officer. Boyd has taught academic programs on structural inequality and health. She specialises in child and community health. She has worked with physicians, professional bodies, local organizers and tech founders in the San Francisco Bay Area to increase access to health services. Following the success of her early blogging experience, Boyd launched an independent platform (Rhea.MD), where she discussed the intersection of race, gender and health. Boyd is particularly concerned about the impact of police brutality on the health and wellbeing of Black boys and men.

Throughout the COVID-19 pandemic, Boyd has spoken about the health disparities experienced by Black Americans. In response to the murder of George Floyd, Boyd became more involved with political activism and the fight for social justice. Boyd was one of many physicians who supported the George Floyd protests throughout the pandemic, saying “protest is a profound public health intervention”. In an interview with Time magazine, Boyd said, “If people were to understand that racism, and all of the social and political and economic inequalities that racism creates, ultimately harms people's health. they would see that protest is a profound public health intervention, because it allows us to finally address and end forms of inequality,”. On June 17, 2020, Boyd gave expert testimony to the U.S. Congress' House of Representatives' House Committee on Energy and Commerce on “Health Care Inequality: Confronting Racial and Ethnic Disparities in COVID-19 and the Health Care System”.

Boyd worked with Monica McLemore to devise new standards on publishing racial health inequities. Unfortunately, the academic publishing process has allowed scholarship that confuses and often attempts to minimise the role of racism in determining health outcomes. Boyd and McLemore believe that “the solution to racial health inequities is to address racism and its attendant harms and erect a new health care infrastructure that no longer profits from the persistence of inequitable disease”.Their suggestions included; (1) Denouncing Biological Race And The Insidious Harms Of Patient Blame, to stop (2) Obfuscating The Role Of Racism In Determining Health And Health Care and the implementation of more (3) Rigorous Standards For Publishing On Racial Health Inequities.

Membership
 2016–present: American Academy of Pediatrics, California Chapter 1, Board Member
 2016–present: American Academy of Pediatrics, Executive Committee on Communications and Media, Executive Committee Member
 California Children's Trust, Director of Equity and Justice

Selected works and publications

Selected works

Selected publications

References

External links
 Rhea Boyd at Palo Alto Medical Foundation
 

Living people
Year of birth missing (living people)
American women physicians
University of Notre Dame alumni
UCSF School of Medicine faculty
Stanford University School of Medicine faculty
African-American physicians
People from Akron, Ohio
American pediatricians
Women pediatricians
Harvard School of Public Health alumni
Vanderbilt University School of Medicine alumni
American women academics